Chit Thet Wai is a 1952 Burmese black-and-white romantic-drama film, directed by Tin Maung starring Tin Maung, Kyi Kyi Htay, Thein Zaw and May Lwin.

Cast
Tin Maung as Tin Aung
Kyi Kyi Htay as May Khin
Thein Zaw as May Aung
May Lwin as Khin May Lwin
Thar Gaung as Thar Gaung
Ba Thit as Ba Thit

Awards

References

1952 films
1950s Burmese-language films
Films shot in Myanmar
Burmese black-and-white films
1952 romantic drama films
Burmese romantic drama films